Fred Done (born March 1943) is a British billionaire businessman and the owner of the bookmaking chain Betfred, which has more than 1,600 betting shops in the UK.

Early life 
Done grew up with three siblings in Ordsall, Greater Manchester. Done and his brother Peter Done left school aged 15 without qualifications after working in their father’s illegal bookmaking business.

Career 
In 1967 aged 24, Done opened his first bookmaker with his brother, which they funded by a win on England's victory in 1966 FIFA World Cup the year before. 

By the mid-1980s, they had more than 70 bookmaking shops. In 1983, Done founded Peninsula Business Services, which has more than 10 companies operating in employment law, workplace health, and human resources.

In 1998, Done paid out early Manchester United to win the Premier League title, making him the first bookmaker to pay out early at the end of the season.

In 2004, Done's chain of bookmakers was renamed Betfred.

In 2015, Done announced he was in talks to sell a 25% stake in The Tote after buying it from the UK government for £265 million in 2011. 

In 2018, Done made an investment in Adzooma, an online advertising platform based in Nottingham, UK.  

In 2020, Done invested in GGRecon, an esports publisher based in Manchester, UK. 

In 2021, Done stepped down as the CEO of Betfred and took up the role as Chairman. 

In 2021, the Sunday Times Rich List estimated Done's net worth to be £1.235 billion.

References

1943 births
Living people
British billionaires
Conservative Party (UK) donors